This is a list of public holidays in Turks and Caicos Islands.

References

Lists of public holidays by country
Turks and Caicos Islands
Turks and Caicos Islands